Charleston Cumberland Presbyterian Church is a historic church on Railroad Street in Charleston, Tennessee.

It was built in 1860 in the Greek Revival architectural style. In 1863, during the American Civil War, Confederate forces used the building as a hospital. It was added to the National Register of Historic Places in 1984.

References

Presbyterian churches in Tennessee
Churches on the National Register of Historic Places in Tennessee
Churches completed in 1860
19th-century Presbyterian church buildings in the United States
Churches in Bradley County, Tennessee
American Civil War hospitals
Greek Revival church buildings in Tennessee
Wooden churches in Tennessee
Cumberland Presbyterian Church
National Register of Historic Places in Bradley County, Tennessee
Charleston, Tennessee
1860 establishments in Tennessee